Jeff Keane is an American cartoonist. He is the youngest son of the late cartoonist Bil Keane who, following his father's death in 2011, became inker and colorist of the syndicated comic strip The Family Circus, after having assisted on it since 1981.

The character Jeffy from The Family Circus was based on the young Jeff Keane, who grew to become a theater major in college, but eventually joined the family business.  He lives in Laguna Hills, California, in the Nellie Gail Ranch community.

Keane was elected president of The National Cartoonists Society (NCS) for the 2007–2009 term.  He was re-elected president for the 2009–2011 term.

At the 2015 Reuben Awards, Keane received the Silver T-Square Award for "outstanding service" to the cartooning profession.

References

External links
 The Family Circus Official Homepage

Year of birth missing (living people)
Living people
American cartoonists